Acrotaenia otopappi is a species of tephritid or fruit flies in the genus Acrotaenia of the family Tephritidae.

Distribution
Mexico.

References

Tephritinae
Insects described in 1899
Diptera of North America